The Art and Design University is an art university located in Cluj-Napoca, Romania. It was founded on November 15, 1925, as the Fine Arts School of Cluj. Formerly known as Academy of Visual Arts "Ioan Andreescu" until 30/06/2000

Faculties
The University has two faculties:
 Faculty of Graphic Arts
 Faculty of Decorative Arts and Design

Undergraduate school 

Department of Painting
 Department of Sculpture
Department of Graphic Arts - Drawing - Painting - Printmaking - Illustration - Graphic design
Department of Fine arts, Photography and Video processing
Department of Conservation and Restoration
Department of Art education and Decorative arts
Department of Ceramics - Glass
Department of Textile arts and Textile design
Department of Wardrobe stylist and Fashion design
Department of Design and Industrial design
Department of Art history and Theory of art

Graduate school 

 Master's degrees in Painting
 Master's degrees in Sculpture
 Master's degrees in Drawing, Painting and Printmaking
 Master's degrees in Comic book and Animation
 Master's degrees in Photography and Videography
 Master's degrees in Conservation and Restoration
 Master's degrees in Ceramics - Glass
 Master's degrees in Textile design
 Master's degrees in Fashion design
 Master's degrees in Design
 Master's degrees in Contemporary curatorial practices
 Phd in Visual Arts

External links
 Old official website
 New official website

Educational institutions established in 1925
Art and Design University of Cluj-Napoca
Art schools in Romania
1925 establishments in Romania